Crackenthorpe is a village.

Crackenthorpe may also refer to:

William Crackenthorpe (disambiguation)
Emma Crackenthorpe, character in Agatha Christie's Marple